Tell the World is the second studio album by Swedish singer Pandora, released in Sweden in February 1995 by Virgin Records. The album peaked at number 11 in Sweden.
The Japanese edition featured "One of Us", originally by ABBA. By September 1996, the album had sold over 455,000 copies in Japan alone.

Reception
Billboard magazine said; "The blonde dance queen Pandora has raised a storm on Scandinavian dance floors over the past two years with her upbeat and direct tracks. Branded the Swedish Madonna, her strongest following is in Finland where her album has gone platinum (50,000 units)."

Track listing 
 "The Outer Reaches" (intro) (Peter Johansson) – 1:11
 "Don't You Know" (Martin Ankelius, Johasson) – 3:50
 "The Naked Sun" (Ankelius, Johasson) – 4:12
 "Tell the World " (Hendrik Anderson, Ankelius, Johasson) – 3:39
 "Love is a Stranger" (Anderson, Johasson) – 3:45
 "Don't Let Me" (Anderson, Johasson) – 4:23
 "Take My Hand" (Anderson, Ankelius, Johasson) – 3:52
 "Can't Fake the Feeling" (Ankelius, Johasson) – 3:18
 "Bedtime" (Anderson, Ankelius, Johasson) – 3:01
 "Work" (Ankelius) – 3:36
 "Rely" (Ankelius) – 4:24
 "Kalahari"  (Anderson, Ankelius, Johasson) – 3:49
 "Don't You Know" (The Sir Family Extended) (Ankelius, Johasson) – 6:18
 "One of Us" (Japanese edition only)  (Benny Andersson, Björn Ulvaeus)– 4:46

Charts

Certifications

Release history

References 

1995 albums
Pandora (singer) albums
Virgin Records albums